Fenerbahçe Spor Kulübü Women's Football, currently also known as Fenerbahçe Petrol Ofisi for sponsorship reasons, is the women's football branch of Fenerbahçe S.K., founded originally in 1995, and re-founded in 2021. The team plays in the Turkish Women's Football Super League.

History

Foundation of the club 
Fenerbahçe was founded in 1907 in Istanbul, Ottoman Empire, by Ziya Songülen, Ayetullah Bey and Necip Okaner. The club's name comes from Fenerbahçe, a neighbourhood in Istanbul. The name literally means "lighthouse garden" in Turkish (from fener, meaning "lighthouse", and bahçe, meaning "garden"), referring to a historic lighthouse located at Fenerbahçe Cape.

Original establishment

1994–95: First season 
Women's football in Turkey saw the establishment of the Women's League in 1994 with the participation of 12 clubs. 

On 4 April 1995, Fenerbahçe S.K. formed their women's football team under the leadershipo of board member Mehmet Ali Aydınlar. The team, managed by Saffet Aktarı and coached by Ziya Özgür, participated at the 1994-95 Women's League.  After playing 12 matches, they finished the season with eight wins, two draws and two losses.

1995–96: Second season 
To strengthen the team, more players were transferred, such as one from Dinarsuspor, three from Acarlar Spor, one from Yenidünya Spor and two expatriates from Romania. The team finished the 95-96 season playing six matches with five wins and one loss. They scored in total 46 goals, and saw four goals in their net. Some of the more significant matches were when the team played against Ankara Dedeoğlu, winning 20-0, and won against Mersin Camspor with 4-0. The squad consisted of Pervin Sanlı, Zerrin Koldamca, Nevra Selışık, Aycan Çağlar, Pınar Çimdik, Yeter Bayrak, Ana Rosca (ROM), Rebeka Fırıncıyan, Ayşe Oktay, Canan Oğuz, Leyla Ersan, Emine Akyüz, Sibel Cımbız, Seda Tamkan, Sevgi Özder, Füsun Öcal, Adriana Grigore (ROM), Nurdan Bekdemir. Later, the women's branch was shut down for economic reasons.

Re-establishment 
The re-establishment of the women's football branch of Fenerbahçe was announced on 26 August 2021, with the note:

2021–22: First season

First match and derby controversy 
With a joint statement they made on 2 December 2021, Fenerbahçe and Galatasaray, the two archrivals, announced that they will hold two friendly matches between women's football teams in order to raise social awareness about violence against women. Any match between Fenerbahçe and Galatasaray is one of the biggest events in the country, called the Intercontinental Derby. 

The first match was held on 7 December 2021 at Galatasaray's Nef Stadium and was broadcast live all over Turkey. Fenerbahçe left the match with a convincing 7–0 win. After the match, Fenerbahçe vice president Erol Bilecik, who congratulated the Fenerbahçe players in the dressing room, cited the historical 6–0 win of the men's team against Galatasaray on 6 November 2002. His speech sparked controversy, as Galatasaray fans started insulting Bilecik and Fenerbahçe female players and soon announcements were made from both clubs calling for the events to calm down. The second match was cancelled after Galatasaray backed down.

Participation in the league 
After the re-establishment, Fenerbahçe took part in Group A of the 2021-22 Women's Super League in its first season. The team completed its group as the leader and participated in the play-offs with the first 4 teams in the group and eliminated Hakkarigücü SK in the play-off quarter-finals. In the semi-finals, the team was eliminated by Fatih Karagümrük.

As a result of the name sponsorship agreement made with Petrol Ofisi before the 2022-2023 season, the name of the team was changed to Fenerbahçe Petrol Ofisi Women's Football Team.

Stadium 
The team played their home matches in the beginning of the 2021-22 Super league season at the club's Fenerbahçe Dereağzı Facility in Kadıköy. They moved to the Beylerbeyi 75. Yıl Stadium in Üsküdar from late March 2022 on.

Statistics 

(1): Finished Group 4 as runner-up, lost in semi final play-offs
(2): Finished Group 1 at third place, no play-offs
(3): Finished Group A as leader, lost in semi final play-offs
(4): Season in progress

Current squad

Current technical staff

Squads history

References 

Fenerbahçe S.K. (football)
Women's football clubs in Turkey
Football clubs in Istanbul
Association football clubs established in 1995
1995 establishments in Turkey
Association football clubs established in 2021
2021 establishments in Turkey